The Kuwaiti Joint Relief Committee is an organization that was described as being suspect of being tied to al Qaeda in Omar Rajab Amin's Combatant Status Review Tribunal.

During his testimony before his Tribunal Amin pointed out that during the six years he worked as director of the committee's work in Bosnia he enjoyed a close working relationship with the American military there.
He suggested that the unsubstantiated suspicions presented to his Tribunal were a misplaced reaction to the shock of the attacks on September 11, 2001.

References

Charities based in Kuwait